Bernard Tomic was the defending champion but chose not to defend his title.

Former world No. 1 Andy Murray played at the tournament and he won his first singles match since hip surgery. In the third round, he lost to Matteo Viola.

Emil Ruusuvuori won the title after defeating Viola 6–0, 6–1 in the final.

Seeds
All seeds receive a bye into the second round.

Draw

Finals

Top half

Section 1

Section 2

Bottom half

Section 3

Section 4

References

External links
Main draw

2019 ATP Challenger Tour